Wayne Biggins (born 20 November 1961) is an English former professional footballer born in Sheffield who made more than 450 appearances in the Football League and also played in the Scottish Football League. He was a striker and was nicknamed "Bertie" throughout his career.

Playing career
Biggins was a latecomer to league football, for although he began his career with Lincoln City he played just eight games for them before he was released. He then played non-league football for Matlock Town and King's Lynn while working as a hod carrier. Biggins found a way back into league football with Burnley, who signed Biggins from Matlock for a nominal fee in February 1984. He scored four goals in his first four appearances for the Lancashire club, including a hat-trick against his former side Lincoln. He was an ever-present for Burnley during the 1984–85 season but despite scoring 21 goals in all competitions he could not prevent the team being relegated to the Fourth Division for the first time in the club's history. Biggins scored four goals in twelve matches at the start of the following campaign and his form attracted the attention of Norwich City, whose manager Ken Brown signed him in October 1985 for a transfer fee of £35,000.

Norwich were re-building their squad after relegation from the first division and were looking to bounce back to the top flight at the first attempt. They succeeded, and Biggins ended the season with a second division championship medal. He stayed at Carrow Road until the summer of 1988 when Manchester City's new manager Mel Machin – who had until that summer been Brown's assistant at Norwich – took him to Maine Road. He scored 9 goals in 32 games for Manchester City before moving to Stoke City in August 1989 for a fee of £250,000. He was a number of expensive signings made by manager Mick Mills in the summer of 1989 as Stoke looked to gain promotion. However results were very poor and cost Mills his job and the new manager Alan Ball failed to stop Stoke's slide and they ended up being relegated to the Third Division, Biggins top-scored in 1989–90 with 11 goals. In 1990–91 Biggins was again leading goalscorer with 12 before enjoying his most prolific season in his career in 1991–92. He scored 28 goals as Stoke lost in the play-offs to Stockport County, although they did beat County in the 1992 Football League Trophy Final.

Not long into the 1992–93 season, Biggins left to join Barnsley where he spent a year before joining up with Lou Macari at Celtic. Biggins endured a poor three-month spell at Celtic Park and returned to Stoke for £125,000 on transfer deadline day in March 1994, before playing out his league career with Luton Town, Oxford United and Wigan Athletic. He won a Third Division championship medal with Wigan in 1997. He went back into non-league football with Leek Town.

Management and coaching
After leaving Leek Town, Biggins moved to Stocksbridge Park Steels, where he became assistant manager and then manager until November 2003. He later played for and coached Buxton.

Personal life
He is the father of footballer Harrison Biggins. Wayne, his wife, and Harrison all had COVID-19 during the COVID-19 pandemic.

Career statistics
Source:

A.  The "Other" column constitutes appearances and goals in the Anglo-Italian Cup, Full Members Cup, Football League Trophy and Screen Sport Super Cup.

Honours
Individual
PFA Team of the Year: 1990–91 Third Division, 1991–92 Third Division

References

External links
 
 
 Career information at ex-canaries.co.uk

Living people
1961 births
Footballers from Sheffield
English footballers
Association football forwards
Lincoln City F.C. players
King's Lynn F.C. players
Matlock Town F.C. players
Burnley F.C. players
Norwich City F.C. players
Manchester City F.C. players
Stoke City F.C. players
Barnsley F.C. players
Celtic F.C. players
Luton Town F.C. players
Oxford United F.C. players
Wigan Athletic F.C. players
Leek Town F.C. players
Stocksbridge Park Steels F.C. players
Buxton F.C. players
English Football League players
Scottish Football League players